The crotonase family comprises mechanistically diverse proteins that share a conserved trimeric quaternary structure (sometimes a hexamer consisting of a dimer of trimers), the core of which consists of 4 turns of a (beta/beta/alpha)n superhelix. 

Some enzymes in the superfamily have been shown to display dehalogenase, hydratase, and isomerase activities, while others have been implicated in carbon-carbon bond formation and cleavage as well as the hydrolysis of thioesters. However, these different enzymes share the need to stabilize an enolate anion intermediate derived from an acyl-CoA substrate. This is accomplished by two structurally conserved peptidic NH groups that provide hydrogen bonds to the carbonyl moieties of the acyl-CoA substrates and form an "oxyanion hole". The CoA thioester derivatives bind in a characteristic hooked shape and a conserved tunnel binds the pantetheine group of CoA, which links the 3'-phosphate ADP binding site to the site of reaction. Enzymes in the crotonase superfamily include:

 Enoyl-CoA hydratase (crotonase), which catalyses the hydratation of 2-trans-enoyl-CoA into 3-hydroxyacyl-CoA.
 3-2trans-enoyl-CoA isomerase (or dodecenoyl-CoA isomerise), which shifts the 3-double bond of the intermediates of unsaturated fatty acid oxidation to the 2-trans position.
 3-hydroxybutyryl-CoA dehydrogenase (crotonase), a bacterial enzyme involved in the butyrate/butanol-producing pathway.
 4-Chlorobenzoyl-CoA dehalogenase, a Pseudomonas enzyme which catalyses the conversion of 4-chlorobenzoate-CoA to 4-hydroxybenzoate-CoA.
 Dienoyl-CoA isomerase, which catalyses the isomerisation of 3-trans,5-cis-dienoyl-CoA to 2-trans,4-trans-dienoyl-CoA.
 Naphthoate synthase (MenB, or DHNA synthetase), a bacterial enzyme involved in the biosynthesis of menaquinone (vitamin K2).
 Carnitine racemase (gene caiD), which catalyses the reversible conversion of crotonobetaine to L-carnitine in Escherichia coli.
 Methylmalonyl CoA decarboxylase (MMCD), which has a hexameric structure (dimer of trimers).
 Carboxymethylproline synthase (CarB), which is involved in carbapenem biosynthesis.
 6-oxo camphor hydrolase, which catalyses the desymmetrization of bicyclic beta-diketones to optically active keto acids.
 The alpha subunit of fatty acid oxidation complex, a multi-enzyme complex that catalyses the last three reactions in the fatty acid beta-oxidation cycle.
 AUH protein, a bifunctional RNA-binding homologue of enoyl-CoA hydratase.

Human proteins containing this domain 
AUH;       CDY2B;     CDYL;      CDYL2;     DCI;       ECH1;      ECHDC1;    ECHDC2;    
ECHDC3;    ECHS1;     EHHADH;    HADHA;     HCA64;     HIBCH;     PECI;

References

Protein domains
Protein families